Dubisson Park is a public park and former major cricket venue in Sainte Madeleine, Trinidad and Tobago.

History
The Park was used by the South Trinidad cricket team for their home matches in the Texaco Cup, with the inaugural first-class match seeing South Trinidad play East Trinidad in the 1975–76 competition. South Trinidad played five first-class matches there until the 1978–79 season. With the loss of first-class status for the Texaco Cup, first-class cricket has not been played at the Park since.

Records

First-class
Highest team total: 365 for 7 by North Trinidad v South Trinidad, 1976–77
Lowest team total: 96 all out by North Trinidad v South Trinidad, as above
Highest individual innings: 105* by Pascall Roberts for North v South Trinidad, 1976–77
Best bowling in an innings: 7-37 by Arnold Oliver for South Trinidad v East Trinidad, 1975–76
Best bowling in a match: 10-79 by Arnold Oliver, as above

See also
List of cricket grounds in the West Indies

References

External links
Dubisson Park at ESPNcricinfo

Cricket grounds in Trinidad and Tobago
Defunct cricket grounds in Trinidad and Tobago
Parks in Trinidad and Tobago